Vilim Posinković (born 10 January 1991) is a Croatian professional footballer who plays as a left winger for Cosmos Coblenz in the Rheinlandliga.

Career
Posinković joined Turkish club Giresunspor on loan from another Turkish club Kayseri Erciyesspor on 30 January 2012 for the rest of the season after having played 15 matches and scoring 2 goals. In March, he scored a goal in a 3–0 victory over Bucaspor. On 4 June 2012, Erciyesspor announced that he was one of the 16 players who was released. On 4 February 2013, he moved to Bosnia and Herzegovina, signing for Olimpik. In June 2013, he signed for Croatian club Slaven Belupo.

In March 2015 Posinković joined Finnish club RoPS. He scored two goals and two assists in the quarterfinal and semifinal of the Finnish League Cup, which guided his club to the final. In October, he scored a goal against Lahti in a league match which RoPS won 2–1. After a stint with another Finnish club Santa Claus, he joined Greek club Kissamikos on 14 September 2015.

After a stint with Cypriot club AEZ Zakakiou, Posinković signed for Polish I Liga club Ruch Chorzów on 19 July 2017, penning a two-year deal, which would keep him in the club till the end of June 2019. On 19 August 2017, he scored his first goal for the club in a 3–1 league victory against Stomil Olsztyn. In October, he found the net in a 2–1 victory against GKS Katowice in a derby. In the summer of 2018, Posinković joined PFC Lokomotiv Plovdiv. He stayed for one year at Lokomotiv, managing to win the 2018–19 Bulgarian Cup with the club.

On 23 September 2019, he returned to Bosnia and Herzegovina, signing a contract with Premier League of Bosnia and Herzegovina club FK Radnik Bijeljina. Posinković made his official debut for Radnik on 5 October 2019, in a 3–2 home league win against FK Sloboda Tuzla. He scored his first goal for Radnik on 19 October 2019, in a 0–3 away league win against FK Tuzla City. Posinković left Radnik in July 2020.

On 1 February 2021, Posinković joined German club FC Rot-Weiß Erfurt. However, he left the club again before making his debut, on 11 April 2021, to sign with Nepal Super League team Lalitpur City FC. Posinković left Nepal again in the summer and returned to Germany, where he began training with his former club, Rot-Weiß Erfurt. He also played a friendly game for Erfurt on 18 July 2021.

In August 2021, Posinković signed with NK Dugopolje in Croatia. On 30 December 2021, he signed with Cypriot club Alki Oroklini.

Honours
Lokomotiv Plovdiv
 Bulgarian Cup: 2018–19

References

External links
 
Vilim Posinković at Sofascore

1991 births
Living people
Footballers from Sarajevo
Croats of Bosnia and Herzegovina
Association football wingers
Croatian footballers
HAŠK players
NK Lučko players
Kayseri Erciyesspor footballers
Giresunspor footballers
Kavala F.C. players
NK Slaven Belupo players
Iraklis Psachna F.C. players
Rovaniemen Palloseura players
FC Santa Claus players
AO Chania F.C. players
AEZ Zakakiou players
Ruch Chorzów players
PFC Lokomotiv Plovdiv players
FK Radnik Bijeljina players
FC Rot-Weiß Erfurt players
Lalitpur City FC players
NK Dugopolje players
Alki Oroklini players
TFF First League players
Football League (Greece) players
Veikkausliiga players
Kakkonen players
Cypriot First Division players
I liga players
First Professional Football League (Bulgaria) players
Premier League of Bosnia and Herzegovina players
Nepal Super League players
First Football League (Croatia) players
Croatian expatriate footballers
Expatriate footballers in Turkey
Expatriate footballers in Greece
Expatriate footballers in Bosnia and Herzegovina
Expatriate footballers in Finland
Expatriate footballers in Cyprus
Expatriate footballers in Poland
Expatriate footballers in Bulgaria
Expatriate footballers in Germany
Expatriate footballers in Nepal
Croatian expatriate sportspeople in Turkey
Croatian expatriate sportspeople in Greece
Croatian expatriate sportspeople in Bosnia and Herzegovina
Croatian expatriate sportspeople in Finland
Croatian expatriate sportspeople in Cyprus
Croatian expatriate sportspeople in Poland
Croatian expatriate sportspeople in Bulgaria
Croatian expatriate sportspeople in Germany
Croatian expatriate sportspeople in Nepal